Kardarigan may refer to:

 Kardarigan (6th century), Sassanid Persian general of the late 6th century
 Kardarigan (7th century) (died 629), Sassanid Persian general of the early 7th century